James Jessop (born 1974) is a British contemporary artist. He trained at The Royal College of Art (RCA) and Coventry University. He lectures at City and Guilds of London Art School.

His work is influenced by early New York City Subway art and pop culture. He mainly works on large scale canvasses with oil paint, mocking Spoof Horror B-Movie posters. His diptych painting, Fused Foot Star, is in the collection of the RCA.

While working as a security guard, he exhibited in Charles Saatchi's March 2004 New Blood exhibition.

Jessop was shortlisted for the £25,000 Threadneedle Prize at the Mall Galleries, London in 2010.

His 2010 solo show, Beauty and the Beast, at High Roller Society in London included some of his largest works to date, designed to make an impact, still fusing street art with more traditional mediums.

Jessop has worked extensively with Polo Ralph Lauren Jeans in the past year as part of their Art Stars project.

In May 2012 Jessop was featured on BBC 1's The Apprentice UK where the team was challenged to sell the work of various Urban Artists.

References
In 2018 Jessop exhihibited at the Artmossphere Biennale in Moscow. During 2019 he was commissioned to make a new work to go on permanent display in Milton Keynes Central Library where today it is  seen by around 20,000 people every month

External links
 

21st-century British painters
British male painters
Living people
1974 births
Date of birth missing (living people)
21st-century British male artists